Ljubljana Town Hall (also known as  or simply  or ) is the town hall in Ljubljana, the capital of Slovenia, is the seat of the City Municipality of Ljubljana. It is located at Town Square in the city centre close to Ljubljana Cathedral.

The original building was built in a Gothic style in 1484, probably according to plans by the Carniolan builder Peter Bezlaj. Between 1717 and 1719, the building underwent a Baroque renovation with a Venetian inspiration by the builder Gregor Maček, Sr., who built based on plans by the Italian architect Carlo Martinuzzi and on his own plans (the gable front, the loggia, and the three-part staircase). In the mid-1920s, a monument to the Serbian and first Yugoslav king Peter I was erected in the entrance of Town Hall. The monument, designed by the architect Jože Plečnik, was removed and destroyed by the Fascist Italian occupation authorities of the Province of Ljubljana in April 1941.

Outside the town hall stands a replica of the Baroque Robba Fountain, work of Francesco Robba. The original work, finished in 1751, is kept in the National Gallery.

References

External links

Town Hall
Government buildings completed in 1719
Town Hall
Town Hall
Town Hall
Town Hall
City and town halls in Slovenia
1719 establishments in the Holy Roman Empire